Late Baroque, last stage of the Baroque era, may refer to:
 Rococo – art, architecture
 Late Baroque (music) – music